The Next Step is a Canadian teen drama series. Created by Frank Van Keeken, the series follows the members of a troupe from the titular dance studio, as they train for and compete in various championships, and deal with rivalries with other dance schools and drama among the team itself. The series is presented in a style influenced by reality television.

The series originally premiered on Family Channel on March 8, 2013, and has spawned digital content, as well as live touring shows featuring its cast members, and a spinoff series, Lost & Found Music Studios. The series moved to CBC Television's streaming platform CBC Gem in 2020 for its seventh season. The series has also been sold internationally, with broadcasters such as CBBC in the United Kingdom, and Universal Kids in the United States—which became a production partner for its sixth season. In April 2022, an eighth series was announced by British broadcaster CBBC.

Episodes

Cast 

 Alexandra Beaton as Emily
 Victoria Baldesarra as Michelle
 Trevor Tordjman as James
 Brittany Raymond as Riley
 Tamina Pollack Paris as Tiffany
 Jordan Clark as Giselle
 Jennifer Pappas as Chloe
 Isaac Lupien as Eldon
 Samantha Grecchi as Stephanie
 Lamar Johnson as West
 Brennan Clost as Daniel

 Shamier Anderson as Chris
 Bree Wasylenko as Kate

 Logan Fabbro as Amanda
 Natalie Krill as Phoebe
 Zac Vran as Hunter
 Taveeta Szymanowicz-Bramble as Thalia

 Devon Michael Brown as Max
 Cierra Healey as Cierra
 Shantel Angela Vailloo as Shantel
 Myles Erlick as Noah

 Alexandra Chaves as Piper
 Giuseppe Bausilio as Alfie
 Erika Prevost as Sloane
 Akiel Julien as LaTroy
 Skylar Healey as Skylar
 Allie Goodbun as Cassie
 Shelby Bain as Amy
 Briar Nolet as Richelle
 Isaiah Peck as Henry

 Dylan Ratzlaff as Jacquie
 Jessica Lord as Lola
 Julian Lombardi as Ozzy
 Dawson Handy as Josh
 Noah Zulfikar as Kingston
 Milaina Robinson as Zara
 Hanna Miller as Heather
 Sage Linder as Summer
 Emmerly Tinglin as Kenzie
 Liam Mackie as Finn
 Berkeley Ratzlaff as Davis
 Danielle Verayo as Cleo
 Carter Musselman as Heath
 Katie Ortencio as Lily
 Myles Dobson as Nick

Production

Development
On February 24, 2012, Family Channel announced that it had ordered 26 half-hour episodes (including S1 and S1.5), and a four-episode season finale. Special content was also going to be available, including The Next Step Interactive. On April 9, 2013, Family announced that it had renewed the series for a second season, which premiered on March 7, 2014.

On May 5, 2014, the series was renewed for a third season, which premiered on March 16, 2015. On April 16, 2015, it was announced that the series would return for a fourth season, which premiered on February 15, 2016. On March 21, 2016, Frank van Keeken announced on Instagram that The Next Step would return for a fifth season, which premiered on May 26, 2017. In July 2017, the series was renewed for a 26-episode sixth season, which premiered in Canada on September 29, 2018. From then on, Boat Rocker would take over distribution from BBC Worldwide for the series, although the latter would continue to co-fund production and continue to distribute the first five seasons. A 24-episode seventh season premiered on CBC Gem on April 10, 2020, and was preceded with a two-part special in December 2019 on CBBC. In April 2022, British broadcaster CBBC revealed that an eighth season was in production. The season premiered on September 26, 2022 on CBBC in the United Kingdom and YTV in Canada.

Filming

Filming began on July 19, 2012, in Toronto, Ontario. The Next Step is filmed at Filmport Presentation Centre, Toronto.

Exterior and street shots were shot on location in Downtown Toronto. Locations include Dundas Street, Front Street, Jarvis Street, University Avenue, and Yonge Street. The exterior shots posing as The Next Step studio are from Colborne Street.

Broadcast and reception
The series aired from March 8, 2013, to April 7, 2019, on Family Channel in Canada, and from April 10, 2020, to September 18, 2020, on CBC Gem for the series' seventh season. It has aired on Universal Kids in the United States and CBBC in the United Kingdom, respectively.

The series premiere set rating records for Family, with at least 574,000 viewers on its initial broadcast—which set a record for Family's highest-rated original series premiere. On January 8, 2014, BBC Worldwide licensed the series to several international broadcasters, including ABC Me in Australia, Hulu in the United States, and CBBC in the United Kingdom. In Canada, the show also airs on Vrak in French. In August 2017, the U.S. rights to the series were sold to Universal Kids, with the network also becoming a production partner for the sixth season. Boat Rocker Media, owner of the show's producer, Radical Sheep Productions, cited a reduction in funding for the series from DHX Media (owner of the series' Canadian broadcaster Family) as an impetus for the arrangement.

In July 2020, The Next Step was praised by viewers and the media for airing a same-sex kiss, when characters Cleo (Dani Verayo) and Jude (Molly Saunders) kissed after performing a duet together. This was the first same-sex kiss to be featured in the series, following a gay couple being briefly featured in an episode of the fourth season. The scene also made history as the first same-sex kiss to be aired on CBBC.

Awards and nominations

Spinoff

The Next Step set up a spinoff series in its third season, called Lost & Found Music Studios, which uses a similar mockumentary format, and which features some of the cast from The Next Step. The spinoff focuses on musicians and songwriters enrolled together in a special program at a music studio. The series debuted on Family Channel in Canada on December 11, 2015. and later was released on Netflix. The series consists of two seasons of 27 episodes.

Digital content

The Next Step Interactive
The aftershow started when an episode finished. It was approximately 1–3 minutes long, and was hosted by five members: Asha Bromfield, Lovell Adams-Gray, Luke Watters, Kelly McNamee, and Samantha "Sam" Munro. The aftershow talks about The Next Step and breaks down some parts to help the viewer understand storylines.

The Next Step: The Off Season
The Next Step: The Off Season (also titled The Next Step: Off Season) is a short series that depicts events that take place between the fourth and fifth seasons of The Next Step. The series was initially released exclusively on The Family Channel App, and was made be available on YouTube and the Family Channel website starting on May 19, 2017. The short series includes hints for the subsequent fifth season, as well as introducing new characters that are featured in season 5. A second season, titled The Next Step: The Scholarship, depicted events between the fifth and sixth seasons of the series, and introduced characters that would appear in season 6.  A third season, titled The Next Step: Mini Episodes, presents events that take place between the sixth and seventh seasons.

Website
The Next Step has a website with information about the characters, a schedule of episodes, a gallery of shots and videos from the show and a store, with The Next Step related clothing. It also includes a soundtrack for The Next Step.

Tours

Hit The Floor Tour (2013)

In September 2013, Paul Cormack of Family Channel announced that The Next Step cast would go on a tour of Canada:

The cast members that hosted the Hit the Floor Tour were Victoria Baldesarra, Lamar Johnson, Isaac Lupien, Jennifer Pappas, Brittany Raymond, and Trevor Tordjman. Each event consisted of the cast performing on stage in groups, and a Q&A session where the audience could ask questions and get "takeaways" for attending the event. The first 200 attendees were given a wristband, which would get them an autograph signed by the hosts.

Due to the attendance numbers at the previous six malls, Family Channel  moved the event in the Kingsway Mall in Edmonton, Alberta from inside to the parking lot.

The Next Step: Live on Stage (2015)

The Next Step: Live on Stage was a cross-Canada tour that took place in the winter of 2015. It was the second tour for the show. The documentary film The Next Step Live: The Movie depicts the events of this tour. Castmembers on this tour were Victoria Baldesarra, Brittany Raymond, Trevor Tordjman, Jordan Clark, Lamar Johnson, Isaac Lupien, Jennifer Pappas, Logan Fabbro, Samantha Grecchi and Myles Erlick.

Wild Rhythm Tour (2016)
The cast of The Next Step put on a third tour in 2016. This was the first international tour by the cast, and was initially scheduled to hold performances in Canada, Spain, England and Ireland; subsequently show performances were added, including in Portugal, Italy, Australia, and New Zealand. The European and Australian legs of this tour are depicted in the documentary film The Next Step Live on Stage: Show the World.

The cast for the Wild Rhythm Tour were Victoria Baldesarra, Trevor Tordjman, Jordan Clark, Taveeta Szymanowicz, Isaac Lupien, Myles Erlick, and Briar Nolet, with newcomer Isaiah Peck, who was to star as Henry in season 4, also performing on the tour; Lamar Johnson was added to the tour cast later. Szymanowicz was only on the Canadian leg of the tour, while Brittany Raymond performed in some of the European shows but could not go to the shows in Australia and New Zealand because of a family issue.

The Next Step: Live on Stage (2017)
The cast of The Next Step went on tour in 2017 to Australia, New Zealand, United Kingdom and Dublin, Ireland.

The cast on this tour was similar to the Wild Rhythm Tour but with a few additions. The main cast included Victoria Baldesarra (Michelle), Jordan Clark (Giselle), Brittany Raymond (Riley), Myles Erlick (Noah), Briar Nolet (Richelle), Isaiah Peck (Henry) and Shelby Bain (Amy). For the Australian & New Zealand Leg, the show also included cast members Trevor Tordjman (James), Lamar Johnson (West) and Issac Lupien (Eldon). For the UK & Ireland leg, the shows also included Alexandra Chaves (Piper). In Australia & New Zealand the show was hosted by Disney presenters Adam Roberts & Ashleigh Wells (from Hanging with Adam & Ash). Trevor Tordjman was originally meant to perform on the UK leg of the tour but unfortunately had to pull out due to the filming of Disney Channel's Zombies, and Isaiah Peck missed a couple of the UK shows.

Absolute Dance Tour (2019)
Nine of the season 6 cast toured Australia, Scotland, England, and Ireland, in September, October, and November 2019. The cast for the Absolute Dance Tour were Isaiah Peck, Shelby Bain, Alexandra Chaves, Berkeley Ratzlaff, Sage Linder, Dylan Ratzlaff, Liam Mackie, Noah Zulfikar, and Briar Nolet. Victoria Baldesarra joined for the Australia leg of the tour, with Myles Erlick joining on the UK leg. Alexandra Chaves missed the first few UK shows due to health issues, but rejoined in Manchester initially doing fewer dances before recovering completely towards the end of the tour.

Fans also had the chance to meet and greet the cast and have their photo taken with them. The meet and greet included watching them rehearse, a private question and answer session, a signed poster and a VIP meet and greet lanyard all before the show. They did two shows on some days, one in the morning and one in the afternoon, whereas on other days, they only did one.

References

External links

 
 

2013 Canadian television series debuts
2010s Canadian comedy-drama television series
2010s Canadian LGBT-related drama television series
2010s Canadian teen drama television series
2010s Canadian teen sitcoms
2020s Canadian comedy-drama television series
2020s Canadian teen drama television series
The Next Step (2013 TV series)
CBBC shows
Dance television shows
English-language television shows
Family Channel (Canadian TV network) original programming
Television series about teenagers
Television shows filmed in Toronto
Television shows set in Toronto
Television series by Temple Street Productions
Television series by Radical Sheep Productions
Television series by Boat Rocker Media